Julius Epstein (1901–1975) was a journalist and scholar, an Austrian Jewish émigré who fled Europe in 1938, worked during World War II in the Office of War Information, and then a prominent American anti-communist researcher and critic of the Soviet Union. He was a research associate at the Hoover Institution on War, Revolution and Peace for decades and authored a study of Operation Keelhaul that was the first account of the forcible repatriation by the Allies of World War II of several million persons to the Soviet Union and countries in its sphere of influence.

Life 
Epstein was the son of Alice Epstein-Strauss grandson of Adele Strauss, and the third wife of "Waltzking" Johann Strauss II. A native of Vienna, Epstein was educated at the Universities of Jena and Leipzig in Germany. He left Germany on March 17, 1933 and lived for a time in Prague, Czechoslovakia. When that country was threatened by Hitler in 1938, he fled with his wife and son to Zurich. In March 1939 the Epstein family arrived in New York City.

Epstein was accredited to the United Nations as foreign correspondent for a number of Swiss newspapers and also contributed articles on the growing crisis in Europe to US magazines. In 1942, he joined the staff of the Office of War Information as language editor. After the war, he was named as New York correspondent for a group of newspapers in West Germany; he contributed articles to German magazines and US periodicals like Plain Talk, Human Events, and National Review.

In 1963, he received an appointment to the Hoover Institution as an assistant to Dr. Stefan Thomas Possony, who conceived the Strategic Defense Initiative. Three years later, he was named professor of international affairs by Lincoln University in San Francisco.

Epstein died in Palo Alto, California. He was survived by his widow, Vally, and a son, Peter Stevens.

Work

Lost cosmonauts 
In 1962, during the height of the Cold War, Epstein alleged that the Soviet Union had lost at least a dozen cosmonauts in undisclosed space disasters. Epstein claimed it was known to the US government, but the State Department did not want "to embarrass the Russians" by revealing it. He wrote, "Washington's silence appears to be motivated by the strong desire to hear no evil, see no evil and speak no evil about the U.S.S.R." Epstein called on the US government to disclose the extent of its knowledge of Soviet space losses: "Now is the time for the government to make the deaths public for the sake of accurate history." These claims are widely believed to be false.

Operation Keelhaul 
In Operation Keelhaul (1973), Epstein revealed details of Operation Keelhaul, the forced repatriation at the end of World War II of four million Soviet citizens, expatriated White Russians who had emigrated from Russia after the Bolshevik Revolution, and other Eastern Europeans to the Soviet Union and countries within its sphere of influence after 1945.  The Soviets considered them as traitors and persecuted them: Red Army POWs and civilians captured by the Nazis as well as followers of Andrei Vlasov's Russian Liberation Army. Most were condemned to lengthy prison terms, some in the gulag, and many were executed, including some who were summarily executed within earshot of British and American troops the moment that they were handed over to the Soviets.

Described by Aleksandr Solzhenitsyn as "the last secret of World War II," the forced repatriation was agreed upon in a secret codicil to the Yalta Agreement and was kept secret for decades after World War II. Epstein first became aware of Operation Keelhaul in 1954 while he was doing other research at a government archive. He was told the files notated in the card catalogue as "383.74: Forcible Repatriation of Soviet Citizens – Operation Keelhaul" were classified.

He worked for 20 years to acquire the files necessary to write his comprehensive treatment on the subject. He had to sue the government to force them to declassify and release the files.

Bibliography 
Books
 The Case Against Vera Micheles Dean and the Foreign Policy Association, 1947.
 The Mysteries of the Van Vliet Report: A Case History, Chicago: Polish American Congress, Inc., 1951.
 Operation Keelhaul: The Story of Forced Repatriation from 1944 to the Present, Old Greenwich, Connecticut: Devin-Adair, 1973.
Articles;
 "The Bang-Jensen Tragedy:  A Review Based on the Official Records," American Opinion (May 1960)

References

External links 
Julius Epstein Papers

1901 births
1975 deaths
Jewish emigrants from Austria to the United States after the Anschluss
Writers from Vienna
Jewish American historians
American male non-fiction writers
Historians of World War II
20th-century American historians
People of the United States Office of War Information